The emperor dragonfly or blue emperor (Anax imperator) is a large species of hawker dragonfly of the family Aeshnidae, averaging  in length. The generic name Anax is from the ancient Greek , "lord"; the specific epithet imperator is the Latin for "emperor", from imperare, to command.

Distribution
This dragonfly has a wide distribution; it is found throughout Africa and through most of Europe, the Arabian Peninsula, and south-western and central Asia.  Since 2000, its range has expanded in Europe, both northwards and to higher altitudes.

Behaviour

They frequently fly high up into the sky in search of prey, which includes butterflies, other Odonata and tadpoles; small prey is eaten while flying. They breed in a variety of aquatic habitats from large ponds to dikes, but they require a plentiful supply of vegetation in the water. The females lay the eggs into plants such as pondweed, and always lay alone. The larvae are very aggressive and are likely to influence the native species composition of colonized freshwater ecosystems. The adult male is highly territorial, and difficult to approach. In the summer months emperor dragonflies are frequent visitors to gardens, being especially prevalent in the southern counties of Great Britain.

Identification
When they first emerge, both sexes appear pale green with brown markings. The legs are brown with a yellow like base. Wings are born black but grow yellow-brown when they grow. Males have a sky blue abdomen marked with a diagnostic black dorsal stripe and an apple green thorax. The thorax and head of a male is green and their prominent eyes are blue. Females have similar markings but they are mainly green.

References

External links
Blue Emperor - OdonataMAP - Atlas of African Odonata

Aeshnidae
Dragonflies of Europe
Insects described in 1815